Klodian Arbëri (born 10 October 1979) is an Albanian retired football player.

Club career
The striker had several stints with KS Tomori Berat in the Albanian Superliga.

Arbëri previously played for NK Maribor in the Slovenian PrvaLiga.

Personal life
He is the brother of Theodhor Arbëri and Arben Arbëri.

References

External sources
 
 

1979 births
Living people
Sportspeople from Berat
Albanian footballers
Association football forwards
FK Tomori Berat players
NK Maribor players
KF Vllaznia Shkodër players
KS Lushnja players
KF Skënderbeu Korçë players
FK Dinamo Tirana players
KF Bylis Ballsh players
Luftëtari Gjirokastër players
Albanian expatriate footballers
Expatriate footballers in Slovenia
Albanian expatriate sportspeople in Slovenia